Charles Corey may refer to:

Charles Corey (clergyman) (1834–1899)
Charles Corey (American football coach) (1915–2013)
Charles Corey (politician), see Frank D. O'Connor
Charles Corey (editor) of British Journal of Photography

See also
Charles Corri (1861–1941), English musician
Charles B. Cory (1857–1921), American ornithologist and golfer